Chinderi is the capital town of the Krachi Nchumuru district in the Oti Region of Ghana.

Location
Chinderi is 6.5 nautical miles to the west of Borae and further still from Kwadjobri. To the south are Buafori and Bagjamse. Its western neighbours include Guibi and Kaniem. Towns to the north include Burai, Bachin Gulubi, Boral Wiae and Kpandai.

See also
Krachi Nchumuru (district)
Krachi Nchumuru (Ghana parliament constituency)

References

External links and sources
 Krachi Nchumuru District Official website

Populated places in the Oti Region